Thomas Leys (1764–1809) was an Aberdeen magistrate and merchant who was twice Provost of Aberdeen. His most notable action was the creation of Union Street, Aberdeen.

Life

He was the son of Francis Leys (d.1788), a Baillie in Aberdeen, and his wife, Elizabeth Ingram, daughter of William Ingram, a merchant in Huntly. His parents had married in 1755. Thomas was born in 1764. His father was a partner in Leys, Masson & Co, who had a thread and cloth mill at Gordon's Mills in Aberdeen (later known as Grandholm Works).

On his father's death in 1788 Thomas inherited the mills and a recently acquired estate at Glasgowforest in the parish of Kinellar.

He appears to have trained as a lawyer and was serving as Chief Magistrate of Aberdeen in the late 18th century. At this phase he was involved in the plans to create a major new road in the centre, with Baillie James Hadden, which later materialised as Union Street, Aberdeen which was built over a ten year period roughly 1800 to 1810.

He was first elected Provost of Aberdeen in 1797, serving a then-standard two year term. He served a second term 1803 to 1805. He died unmarried on 24 October 1809 aged only 45.

His sister Christian Leys (d.1809) married Provost Alexander Brebner of Learnie who was also a partner in Leys Masson & Co.

References
 

1764 births
1809 deaths
People from Aberdeen
Lord Provosts of Aberdeen